Anton Spasov (born 26 March 1975) is a former Bulgarian football player.

Career
Born in Kazanlak, Spasov began playing football with the local Rozova Dolina.

In 1997, he transferred to Naftex Burgas and became a top scorer in A PFG for 1998 with 17 goals. He ended his career at the age of 29 years at the end of 2003-2004 season. In 2009 at the age of 34 years, he returned to active career and signed with Neftochimic Burgas in South-East V Group.

Honours
 Bulgarian League top scorer: 1998 (17 goals).

References

1975 births
Living people
Bulgarian footballers
FC Chernomorets Burgas players
Neftochimic Burgas players
First Professional Football League (Bulgaria) players

Association football forwards
People from Kazanlak